Bengeri is a village in Hubli City, Dharwad district of Karnataka, India.

References

Villages in Dharwad district